George Edward Milner (17 March 1938 – 6 August 2005) was an Australian rules footballer who played with Melbourne in the Victorian Football League (VFL).

Notes

External links 

1938 births
Australian rules footballers from Victoria (Australia)
Melbourne Football Club players
2005 deaths